DOT1-like (Disruptor of telomeric silencing 1-like), histone H3K79 methyltransferase (S. cerevisiae), also known as DOT1L, is a protein found in humans, as well as other eukaryotes.
The methylation of histone H3 lysine 79 (H3K79) by DOT1L which is a conserved epigenetic mark in many eukaryotic epigenomes, increases progressively along the aging process, suggesting that "DOT1L might function as a vital clock, ticking the hours impassively".

DOT1L has been reported to play an important role in the processes of mixed-lineage leukemia (MLL)-rearranged leukemias

Small molecule inhibitors of Dot1L catalytic activity have been developed.

All three forms of H3K79 methylation (H3K79me1; H3K79me2; H3K79me3) are catalyzed by DOT1 in yeast or DOT1L in mammals.  H3K79 methylation participates in the DNA damage response and has multiple roles in nucleotide excision repair and sister chromatid recombinational repair.

References

Further reading

External links